Thierry Daubresse is a Paralympian athlete from Belgium competing mainly in category F42 shot put events.

Thierry competed in the 1996 Summer Paralympics in  Atlanta where he won a gold medal in the F42 shot put as well as competing in the pentathlon, discus and javelin.  He failed in his attempt to defend his title in 2000 when finishing third in the shot put as well as competing in the discus.

External links
 profile on paralympic.org

Paralympic athletes of Belgium
Athletes (track and field) at the 1996 Summer Paralympics
Athletes (track and field) at the 2000 Summer Paralympics
Paralympic gold medalists for Belgium
Paralympic bronze medalists for Belgium
Living people
Medalists at the 1996 Summer Paralympics
Medalists at the 2000 Summer Paralympics
Year of birth missing (living people)
Paralympic medalists in athletics (track and field)
Belgian male shot putters
Shot putters with limb difference
Paralympic shot putters